Stefan Milojević (born 29 January 1989) is a Serbian footballer, who plays as a midfielder for Trayal Kruševac.

References

External links
 
 
 

1989 births
Living people
Footballers from Belgrade
Association football midfielders
Serbian footballers
FK Teleoptik players
FK Voždovac players
FK Banat Zrenjanin players
FK Borac Čačak players
FK Bežanija players
FK Novi Pazar players
FK Kolubara players
Serbian First League players
Serbian SuperLiga players
Serbian expatriate footballers
Serbian expatriate sportspeople in Finland